Now Bijar Mahalleh-ye Mohsenabad (also Romanized as Now Bījār Maḩalleh-ye Moḩsenābād; also known as Now Bījār Maḩalleh) is a village in Kiashahr Rural District, Kiashahr District, Astaneh-ye Ashrafiyeh County, Gilan Province, Iran. At the 2006 census, its population was 211, in 60 families.

References 

Populated places in Astaneh-ye Ashrafiyeh County